This is a list of rivers in Burundi. This very partial list is arranged by drainage basin, with respective tributaries indented under each larger stream's name.

Mediterranean Sea
Nile
White Nile
Victoria Nile (Uganda)
Lake Victoria
Kagera River
Ruvubu River
Ruvyironza River
Nyabarongo River
Kanyaru River

Atlantic Ocean
Congo River (Democratic Republic of the Congo)
Lualaba River (Democratic Republic of the Congo)
Lukuga River (Democratic Republic of the Congo)
Lake Tanganyika
Malagarasi River (Muragarazi River)
Moyowosi River
Rumpungu River
Mulembwé River
Jiji River
Ruzizi River
Ruhwa River

References

Central Intelligence Agency 1996
GEOnet Names Server

Burundi
Rivers